Juliet M Daniel is a Barbadian-born Canadian biology professor at McMaster University, where her research focuses on cancer biology. Daniel is recognized in the cancer biology field for the discovery and naming of the gene Kaiso, and is the recipient of several prestigious awards in recognition of her research and leadership, including an Ontario Premier Research Excellence Award and a Vice-Chancellor Award from the University of the West Indies.

Education and career 
In 1987, Daniel completed a Bachelor's degree in life sciences at Queen's University, and then a PhD in microbiology at the University of British Columbia in 1993. Daniel completed post-doctoral research fellowships for three years at St. Jude Children’s Research Hospital, and then followed her supervisor's move to Vanderbilt University, in Memphis, Tennessee, where she stayed for another three years.

During her fellowship, Daniel discovered the gene Kaiso, and named it after calypso (a popular form of Caribbean music). Daniel found that Kaiso transcriptionally regulates genes involved in cell proliferation and cell adhesion.

Following her post-doctoral fellowship, Daniel joined McMaster University's Department of Biology in November 1999, where she is now a full professor. Prof. Daniel's lab studies triple-negative breast cancer (TNBC), specifically to identify genetic risk factors which may explain the prevalence and high mortality associated with TNBC in women of African ancestry. In 2017, Prof. Daniel's lab demonstrated that Kaiso plays a role in the proliferation and survival of TNBC cells.

Prof. Daniel's research has been cited over 4,000 times and she has an h-index of 26. She has been recognized for her research and mentorship by multiple awards, including 100 Accomplished Black Canadian (ABC) Women, a BBPA Harry Jerome Innovation and Technology Award, YWCA Hamilton – Woman of Distinction Award and a Gold Crown of Merit for Cancer Research, Barbados National Honor. Prof. Daniel was most recently recognized with a WXN Canada’s Most Powerful Women: Top 100 Award. 

She has received funding from both national and international agencies, including CIHR, NSERC and the US CDMRP (Congressionally Directed Medical Research Programs) Breast Cancer IDEA Awards.

Prof. Daniel mentors African Caribbean students at McMaster University, and within the community of Hamilton. Hamilton. In 2006, Prof. Daniel co-founded the Canadian Multicultural LEAD Organization for Mentoring & Training.

Personal life 
Prof. Daniel was diagnosed with breast cancer. Following treatment, she is now healthy.

Awards 

 2021 University of the West Indies (UWI) Honorary Doctor of Science (DSc), Cave Hill, Barbados 
 2020 WXN Canada’s Most Powerful Women: Top 100 Award, Toronto, ON 
 2020 International Women’s Day “Black Women in STEM”, Jamaican Canadian Association, Toronto, ON 
 2019 Woman of Purpose Award, Elegant You Tea Party, Toronto, ON 
 2019 University of the West Indies (UWI) Vice Chancellor’s Award, Toronto, ON 
 2018 100 Accomplished Black Canadian (ABC) Women, 100ABC, Toronto, ON 
 Harry Jerome Award (Category: Technology and Innovation) (2017).
 Ontario Premier's Excellence in Research Award.
 Barbados Honor Gold Crown of Merit. 
 National Ball Award.
 John C. Holland Award (for Professional Achievement).
 Gold Crown of Merit for Cancer Research Barbados National Honor, Barbados (2010); 
Errol Walton Barrow Award of Excellence, Barbados Ball Canada Aid,  Toronto (2009); 
African Canadian Achievement Award of Excellence in Science, Toronto (2008)
Minority Scholar Award, American Association for Cancer Research (2004); 
Ontario Premier Research Excellence Award, McMaster (2001-2006); NSERC pre- (1989–91) & post- (1994–96) doctoral scholarships.

Selected bibliography 

1. Hidalgo-Sastre A, Desztics J, Dantes Z, Schulte K, Ensarioglu HK, Bassey-Archibong B, Ollinger R, Engleiter T, Rayner L, Einwächter H, Daniel JM, Altaee ASA, Steiger K, Lesina M, Rad R, Reichert M, von Figura G, Siveke JT, Roland M. Schmid RM, and Lubeseder-Martellato C. Loss of Wasl improves pancreatic cancer outcome. (2020) JCI Insight 5(10): e127275

2. Hercules SM, Hercules JC, Ansari A*, Date SJA, Skeete DHA, Connell SS, Pond G & Daniel JM.
High Triple Negative Breast Cancer Prevalence and Aggressive Prognostic Factors in Barbadian women with Breast Cancer. (2020) Cancer 126(10): 2217-2224 

3. Robinson SC, Chaudhary R, Jimenz-Saiz R, Rayner LGA, Bayer L, Jordana M and Daniel JM. Kaiso-induced intestinal inflammation is preceded by diminished E-cadherin expression and intestinal integrity. (2019) PLoS ONE 14:e0217220    

4. Pierre CC, Hercules SM, Yates C and Daniel JM. Dancing from bottoms up - Kaiso Roles in Cancer. (2019) BBA-Cancer Reviews 1871: 64-74

5. Robinson SC, Donaldson- Kabwe NS, Dvorkin-Gheva A, Longo J*, He L* and Daniel JM. The POZ-ZF transcription factor Znf131 is implicated as a regulator of Kaiso-mediated biological processes. (2017) Biochem. Biophys. Res. Commun. 493: 416-421

6. Bassey-Archibong BI, Hercules SM, Rayner LGA, Skeete DH, Smith Connell S, Brain I, Daramola A, Banjo A, Jung S, Gardner K, Dushoff J and Daniel JM.  Kaiso is highly expressed in TNBC tissues of women of African ancestry compared to Caucasian women. (2017) Cancer Causes and Control 28(11): 1295-1304

7. Kwiecien JM, Bassey-Archibong BI, Rayner LGA, Dabrowski W, Lucas AR and Daniel JM. Loss of Kaiso expression in breast tumor cells prevents intra-vascular invasion in mice lungs and secondary metastasis. (2017) PLoS ONE 12(9): e0183883
8. Robinson SC, Klobucar K*, Pierre CC, Ansari A*, Zhenilo S, Prokhortchouk E and Daniel JM. Kaiso differentially regulates components of the Notch signaling pathway in intestinal cells. (2017) Cell Communication and Signaling 15(1): 24
9. Bassey-Archibong BI, Rayner LGA, Hercules SM, Aarts CW, Dvorkin-Gheva A, Bramson JL, Hassell JA, and Daniel JM. Kaiso depletion attenuates the growth and survival of triple negative breast cancer cells. (2017) Cell Death and Disease 
8, e2689

10. Bassey-Archibong BI, Kwacien JM, Milosavljevic S, Hallett RM, Rayner LGA, Erb MJ, Crawford-Brown CJ*, Stephenson KB, Bedard P-A, Hassell JA and Daniel JM. Kaiso depletion attenuates transforming growth factor-β signaling and metastatic activity of triple negative breast cancer cells. (2016) NPG-Oncogenesis 5, e208

11. Wang H, Liu W, Black S, Turner O, Daniel JM, Dean-Colomb W, He QP, Davis M and Yates C. 
Kaiso, a transcriptional repressor, promotes cell migration and invasion of prostate cancer cells through regulation of miR-31 expression. (2016) Oncotarget 7(5): 5677-5689

12. Pierre CC, Longo J*, Hallett RM, Milosavljevic S, Bassey BI, Beatty L*, Hassell JA and Daniel JM. Methylation-dependent regulation of hypoxia inducible factor-1 alpha gene expression by the transcription factor Kaiso. (2015) BBA- Gene Regulatory Mechanisms 1849(12): 1432-1441

13. Pierre CC, Longo J*, Mavor M*, Milosavljevic S, Chaudhary R, Gilbreath E, Yates C and Daniel JM. Kaiso overexpression promotes intestinal inflammation and potentiates intestinal tumorigenesis in ApcMin/+ mice (2015) BBA- Molecular Basis of Disease 1842(9): 1846-1855

14. Chaudhary R, Pierre CC, Nanan K, Wojtal D*, Morone S, Pinelli C, Wood GM, Robine S and Daniel JM. The POZ‐ZF transcription factor Kaiso (ZBTB33) induces inflammation and progenitor cell differentiation in the murine intestine. (2013) PLoS ONE 8(9): e74160.

15. Donaldson NS, Pierre CC, Anstey MI, Robinson SC, Weerawardane S and Daniel JM.  Kaiso represses the cell cycle gene cyclin D1 via sequence-specific and methyl-CpG-dependent mechanisms. (2012) PLoS ONE 7(11): e50398.

16. Vermeulen JF, van de Ven RAH, Ercan C, van der Groep P, van der Wall E, Bult P, Christgen M, Lehmann U, Daniel JM, van Diest PJ and Derksen PWB. Nuclear Kaiso Expression is associated with High Grade and Triple-Negative Invasive Breast Cancer. (2012) PLoS ONE 7(5): e37864.

17. Nanan KK and Daniel JM.  ZBTB33 (Mus musculus).  (2010) Transcription Factor Encyclopedia. 13 (3) http://www.cisreg.ca/cgi-bin/tfe/articles.pl?tfid=944

18. Donaldson NS, Nordgaard CL, Pierre CC, Kelly KF, Robinson S, Swystun L*, Henriquez R*, Graham M and Daniel JM. Kaiso regulates Znf131-mediated transcriptional activation. (2010) Exp. Cell Res. 316: 1692-1705.

19. Brown ST, Kelly KF, Daniel JM and Nurse CA. Hypoxia inducible factor (HIF)-2 is required for the development of the catecholaminergic phenotype of sympathoadrenal cells. (2009) J. Neurochem. 110: 622-630.

20. Ferber EC, Kajita M, Wadlow A, Tobiansky L, Niessen C, Ariga H, Daniel J, Fujita Y. A role for the cleaved cytoplasmic domain of E-cadherin in the nucleus. (2008) J. Biol. Chem. 283:12691-12700.

21. Donaldson NS, Daniel Y*, Kelly KF, Graham M and Daniel JM. Nuclear trafficking of the novel POZ-ZF protein Znf131. (2007) BBA- Mol. Cell Res.1773: 546-555.

22. Daniel JM. Dancing in and out of the nucleus: p120ctn and the transcription factor Kaiso. (2007) BBA- Molecular Cell Research Special issue “The p120-Catenin Protein Family”. 1773: 59-68. (Guest Co-editor with Dr. Alpha Yap).    

23. Kelly KF and Daniel JM. POZ for Effect – POZ-ZF Transcription Factors in Cancer and Development. (2006) Trends Cell Biol. 16: 578-587.

24. Defossez PA, Kelly KF, Filion G, Magdinier F, Menoni H, 
Nordgaard CL, Daniel JM and Gilson E. The human enhancer-blocker CTCF interacts with the transcription factor Kaiso. (2005) J. Biol. Chem. 280:43017-43023.  

25. Spring CM, Kelly KF, O’Kelly I, Graham M, Crawford HC and Daniel JM.  The catenin p120ctn inhibits Kaiso-mediated Transcriptional Repression of the -catenin/TCF target gene matrilysin. (2005) Exp. Cell Res. 305:253- 265.

26. Kim SW, Park JI, Spring CM, Sater AK, Ji H, Otchere AA, Daniel JM and McCrea PD. Non-Canonical Wnt signals are modulated by the Kaiso transcriptional repressor and p120-catenin. (2004) Nat. Cell Biol. 6: 1212-1220.

27. Kelly KF, Otchere AA, Graham M and Daniel JM. Nuclear Import of the BTB/POZ Transcriptional Regulator Kaiso. (2004) J. Cell Sci. 117: 6143-6152.

28. Rodova M, Kelly KF, VanSaun M, Daniel JM and Werle MJ.  Regulation of the Rapsyn promoter by Kaiso and -catenin. (2004) Mol. Cell. Biol. 24: 7188-7196.

29. Kelly KF, Spring CM, Otchere AA and Daniel JM. NLS-dependent nuclear localization of p120ctn is necessary to relieve Kaiso-mediated transcriptional repression. (2004) J. Cell Sci. 117:2675-2686.

30. Daniel JM, Spring CM, Reynolds AB, Crawford HC and Baig A.  The p120ctn-binding partner Kaiso is a bi-modal DNA-binding protein that recognizes both a sequence-specific consensus and methylated CpG dinucleotides.  (2002) Nucleic Acids Res. 30: 2911-2919.

31. Kim SW, Fang X, Ji L, Paulson AF, Daniel JM, Ciesiolka M, van Roy F and McCrea PD. Isolation and characterization of XKaiso, a transcriptional repressor that associates with the catenin Xp120ctn in Xenopus laevis. (2002) J. Biol. Chem.  277: 8202-8208.

32. Daniel JM, Ireton RC and Reynolds AB. Monoclonal antibodies to Kaiso, a novel transcription factor and p120ctn-binding protein. (2001) Hybridoma 20: 159-166.

33. Thoreson MA, Anastasiadis PZ, Daniel JM, Ireton RC, Wheelock MJ, Johnson KR, Hummingbird DK and Reynolds AB.  Selective uncoupling of p120ctn from E-cadherin disrupts strong adhesion. (2000) J. Cell Biol. 148: 189-201. 

34. Mariner DJ, Sirotkin H, Daniel JM, Lindman BR, Mernaugh RL, Patten AK, Thoreson MA, Kucherlapati R and Reynolds AB.  Production and characterization of monoclonal antibodies to ARVCF.  (1999) Hybridoma 18: 343-349. 

35. Daniel JM and Reynolds AB.  The catenin p120ctn interacts with Kaiso, a novel BTB/POZ domain zinc finger transcription factor. (1999) Mol. Cell. Biol. 19: 3614-3623. 

36. Daniel JM and Reynolds AB. Tyrosine phosphorylation and cadherin/catenin function. (1997) Bioessays 19: 883-891. 

37. Reynolds AB, Jenkins NA, Gilbert DJ, Copeland NG, Shapiro DN, Wu J and Daniel JM.  The gene encoding p120cas, a novel catenin, localizes on human chromosome 11q11 (CTNND) and mouse chromosome 2 (Catns). (1996) Genomics 31: 127-129. 

38. Reynolds AB, Zhang Z, Wu J, Daniel JM and Mo Y-Y. The novel catenin p120cas binds classical cadherins and induces an unusual morphological phenotype in NIH 3T3 fibroblasts. (1996) Exp.  

39. Daniel JM and Reynolds AB.  The tyrosine kinase substrate p120cas binds directly to E-cadherin but not APC or -catenin. (1995) Mol. Cell. Biol. 15: 4819-4824. 

40. Reynolds AB, Daniel J, McCrea PD, Wheelock MT, Wu J and Zhang Z.  Identification of a new catenin:  The tyrosine kinase substrate p120cas associates with E-cadherin complexes.  (1994) Mol. Cell. Biol. 14: 8333-8342. 

41. Daniel J, Bush J, Cardelli J, Spiegelman GB and Weeks G.  Isolation of two novel ras genes in Dictyostelium discoideum; evidence for a complex, developmentally regulated ras gene subfamily. (1994) Oncogene 9: 501-508. 

42. Bush J, Franek K, Daniel J, Spiegelman GB, Weeks G and Cardelli J. Cloning and characterization of 5 novel Dictyostelium discoideum rab-related genes. (1993) Gene 136: 55-60. 

43. Daniel J, Spiegelman GB and Weeks G.  Characterization of a third ras gene, rasB, that is expressed throughout the growth and development of Dictyostelium discoideum. (1993) Oncogene 8:1041-1047. 

44. Kwong L, Xie Y, Daniel J, Robbins SM and Weeks G.  A Dictyostelium morphogen that is essential for stalk cell formation is generated by a subpopulation of pre-stalk cells. (1990) Development 110: 303-310.

References 

Living people
21st-century American biologists
American women biologists
Queen's University at Kingston alumni
University of British Columbia Faculty of Science alumni
Vanderbilt University alumni
Academic staff of McMaster University
Cancer researchers
Year of birth missing (living people)